Talía Barrios (born November 22, 1980) is a Peruvian former swimmer, who specialized in sprint freestyle events. She represented Peru at the 2000 Summer Olympics, and also trained for the Bolles School Swim Club in Fort Lauderdale, Florida under head coaches Larry Shofe and Gregg Troy.

Barrios competed only in the women's 50 m freestyle at the 2000 Summer Olympics in Sydney. She achieved a FINA B-cut of 27.22 from the Pan American Games in Winnipeg, Manitoba, Canada. She challenged seven other swimmers in heat four, including Russian import Yekaterina Tochenaya of Kyrgyzstan, and Yugoslavia's two-time Olympian Duška Radan. She saved a seventh spot over Guinea's Aissatou Barry by a wide margin of 7.68 seconds in 28.11. Barrios failed to advance into the semifinals, as she placed fifty-second overall out of 74 swimmers in the prelims.

References

1980 births
Living people
Pan American Games competitors for Peru
Olympic swimmers of Peru
Swimmers at the 1999 Pan American Games
Swimmers at the 2000 Summer Olympics
Peruvian female freestyle swimmers
Sportspeople from Lima
21st-century Peruvian women